It was the first edition of the tournament.
Daniel Muñoz de la Nava won the title, defeating Radu Albot in the final, 6–0, 6–1.

Seeds

Draw

Finals

Top half

Bottom half

External links
 Main Draw
 Qualifying Draw

Hoff Open - Singles
2015